William Gwinn Mather (September 22, 1857 – April 5, 1951) was an American industrialist.

Mather was born in Ohio and attended Trinity College for his undergraduate and MA degrees. Mather headed the Cleveland-Cliffs Iron Company for 50 years from 1890 through 1940. During his tenure he consolidated several mining operations and diversified into iron-ore industries and steel operations. The company's flagship bulk freighter was named in his honor, and today serves as a maritime museum in Cleveland, Ohio.

Gwinn Estate
Mather is also known for the palatial estate he built outside of Cleveland and the gardens designed by Charles A. Platt, Ellen Biddle Shipman, and Warren H. Manning.  The gardens, named for Mather's mother Elizabeth Lucy Gwinn, include a mixture of formal and "wild" gardens and extensive statuary and fountains designed by significant sculptors including Paul Manship.

Gwinn Michigan
In 1901, Mather purchased land in Marquette County, Michigan for his company's operations. He had Warren H. Manning design a residential community to support his operations. On June 24, 2002, Gwinn, Michigan was listed in the National Register of Historic Places as the "Gwinn Model Town Historic District, Forsyth Township, Marquette County, Michigan".

See also
 
 SS. William G. Mather Maritime Museum in Cleveland, Ohio
 Gwinn, Michigan

References

 Harvard Business School biography Accessed May 31, 2007

1857 births
1951 deaths
Businesspeople from Cleveland
Burials at Lake View Cemetery, Cleveland
Trinity College (Connecticut) alumni

19th-century American businesspeople